Philip Mahony may refer to:

 Philip Mahony (politician) (1897–1972), Irish Clann na Talmhan politician
 Philip Mahony (hurler) (born 1991), Irish hurler